Pennsylvania Route 770 (PA 770) is a , east–west state highway located in McKean county in Pennsylvania.  The western terminus is at PA 59 in Lafayette Township.  The eastern terminus is at PA 646 in Keating Township.

Route description

PA 770 begins in Lafayette Township at an intersection with PA 59.  The route goes east to the village of Custer City, where it has a short concurrency with US 219.  After the concurrency with US 219, the route continues southeast to its terminus at PA 646 in the village of Aiken. The route goes by 3 names at various points—Warren Road, Buffalo–Pittsburgh Highway, and Minard Run Road.

History
The route was signed in December 1962 alongside the creation of PA 321, and has stayed on the same roads since its inception.

Major intersections

PA 770 Truck

Pennsylvania Route 770 Truck is a  truck route bypassing a segment of PA 770 where trucks over 10 tons are prohibited in McKean County.  It begins at the PA 770 terminus in Lafayette Township.  It ends at PA 770 in Bradford Township.  The route is an oddity as it is longer than its main route (PA 770) by one mile, and that its only signed as such westbound, instead of both directions.  The entire route follows PA 59 on its western end, and US 219 on its eastern end.

See also

References

External links

Pennsylvania Highways: PA 770

770
Transportation in McKean County, Pennsylvania